The 1964 pre-Olympic basketball tournament was an international FIBA World Olympic Qualifying Tournament that was basketball tournament held in Yokohama, Japan from 25 September to 3 October 1964. It served as the final qualification tournament for the 1964 Summer Olympics. The top two teams qualified for the Olympics. After the withdrawal of United Arab Republic (FIBA Africa Championship 1964 winners) and Czechoslovakia (5th placers at the 1960 Olympics) two qualifying berths were added to the qualification tournament thus Canada and South Korea qualified to the Olympics.

Team standings

References

External links
1964 Pre-Olympic Basketball Tournament at FIBA Archives

1964
Basketball at the 1964 Summer Olympics
Qualification for the 1964 Summer Olympics
International basketball competitions hosted by Japan
Sport in Yokohama
September 1964 sports events in Asia
October 1964 sports events in Asia